Market Harbour is a solo album by The Wildhearts frontman Ginger Wildheart, released in January 2008 on Round Records. The LP is the third studio album by Ginger.  There are no gaps between the tracks on the album - with each one seguing into one another.

Track listing

Personnel

Ginger - Vocals, guitars, bass, piano, drums, percussion, harmonica, penny flute, keyboards, lap steel

Denzel - Drums, percussion, beatbox, backing vocals

Jase Edwards - Guitar, keyboards, backing vocals

Tim Smith - Guitars, string arrangements, steel drums, backing vocals

Chris Catalyst - Programming, backing vocals, trombone

Bernie Torme - Lead guitar

Warner E. Hodges - Lead guitar

Scott Sorry - Lead vocals, backing vocals

CJ Wildheart - Backing vocals

Dic Decent - Piano, bell string, lead vocals, backing vocals, sound effects

Ben Davies - Piano, hammond, organ

Lee Small -Llead vocals on 'Couple Trouble'

Tom Evans - Violin

Sara Longue - Violin

Harry Escott - Chello

Helen Goatley - Viola

Vix - Lead vocals

Suzy Kirby - Lead vocals

Jake Adams - Lead vocals

Jasmine Adams - Lead vocals

Bic Hayes - Backing vocals

Joanne Spratley - Backing vocals

Tracie Hunter - Backing vocals

Phoebe White - Backing vocals

Trivia:

'Soap Hammer' features a sample from the viral internet video Kersal Massive.

Ginger (musician) albums
2008 albums